The H. K. Deisher Knitting Mill is a historic factory building located in the borough of Kutztown in Berks County, Pennsylvania. The original section was built in 1881, with the third story added in 1903 and addition in 1907. A loading dock was added in the 1950s. It is a three-story, "L"-shaped red brick building on a limestone foundation.  It has a low pitched gable roof topped by a weathervane.  It was used as a knitting mill until 1956, after which it was used as a warehouse.

It was added to the National Register of Historic Places in 1985.

References

Industrial buildings and structures on the National Register of Historic Places in Pennsylvania
Industrial buildings completed in 1881
Industrial buildings completed in 1907
Buildings and structures in Berks County, Pennsylvania
National Register of Historic Places in Berks County, Pennsylvania
1881 establishments in Pennsylvania